The Diocese of Springfield is part of the official name of four dioceses in the United States, three Roman Catholic and one Episcopal:

Roman Catholic Diocese of Springfield in Illinois
Roman Catholic Diocese of Springfield in Massachusetts
Roman Catholic Diocese of Springfield-Cape Girardeau (southern Missouri)
Episcopal Diocese of Springfield (Illinois)